This is a list of robots that appeared in the television series Robot Wars. The robots are listed via their debuting season with their subsequent appearances in following seasons listed as well. They are in alphabetical order, using the names they used in that series, if they competed in more than one series with the same robot that had a different name (e.g. robots that were numbered under the same name), then the name they used in that series is also listed. Series in which robots failed to qualify, as well as robots that failed to qualify for any series, are not listed. Robots that competed in the First, Second and Third World Championships, US, Dutch and German series are listed.

The First Wars

The Second Wars
Red backgrounds denote robots that never competed in the main competition, but competed in a side or trial event

The Third Wars
Red backgrounds denote robots that never competed in the main competition, but competed in a side or trial event

Blue backgrounds denote robots that never competed in a UK competition, but competed in an international event

The Fourth Wars
Blue backgrounds denote robots that never competed in a UK competition, but competed in an international event

Extreme Series 1
Blue backgrounds denote robots that never competed in a UK competition, but competed in an international event

The Fifth Wars

The Sixth Wars
Blue backgrounds denote robots that never competed in a UK competition, but competed in an international event

Extreme Series 2
Blue backgrounds denote robots that never competed in a UK competition, but competed in an international event

The Seventh Wars
Red backgrounds denote robots that never competed in the main competition, but competed in a side or trial event

Blue backgrounds denote robots that never competed in a UK competition, but competed in an international event

Series 8

Series 9
Red backgrounds denote robots that never competed in the main competition, but competed in a side or trial event

Series 10
Red backgrounds denote robots that never competed in the main competition, but competed in a side or trial event

Other Weight Classes

Alongside the main championship, there were also tournaments for alternate weight classes. Below is a list of Antweight, Featherweight, Lightweight, Middleweight and Super Heavyweights including the series they competed in.

Antweight
This category featured robots weighing up to 150g

Featherweight
This category featured robots weighing up to 12 kg

Lightweight
This category featured robots weighing up to 27 kg

Middleweight
This category featured robots weighing up to 54 kg

Yellow backgrounds denote lightweight robots that were entered into the middleweight class

Super Heavyweight
This category featured robots weighing up to 154 kg

Yellow backgrounds denote heavyweight robots that were entered into the super heavyweight class

International Series Competitors

To suite its specific audience, three more Robot Wars series were produced for the American, Dutch and German audience. Below is a list of all competitors in all these series.

US Season 1
Red backgrounds denote robots that never competed in the US Championship, but competed in side events

Blue backgrounds denote robots that never competed in any US competition, but competed in an international event

US Season 2
Red backgrounds denote robots that never competed in the US Championship, but competed in side events

Blue backgrounds denote robots that never competed in any US competition, but competed in an international event

Nickelodeon

Blue backgrounds denote robots that never competed in any US competition, but competed in an international event

Dutch Series 1

Dutch Series 2

German Series
Green backgrounds denote robots that never competed in the German championship, but competed in a side event or special episode

References

Robot Wars (TV series)
Robot Wars